The pañcānana, also called the , are the five faces of Shiva corresponding to his five activities: creation, preservation, destruction, concealing grace, and revealing grace. The names, qualities, and attributes of these five aspects of Shiva are described in the Śaiva agamas and puranas.

Aspects 

Though bearing each a different name, form, and set of qualities, these are all aspects of Śiva and are not to be looked upon as different deities.

Sadyojāta 
Represents Icchā Śaktī. This face of Śiva will give both happiness and sadness to all creatures. Direction is West. This face of Śiva can potentially evoke curse and anger from Śiva. Represents Jalandhara Pīṭha. One billion mantras are trying to describe this face of Śiva. White in color. Ahaṃkāra element representing perfected ego. The fearsome aspect. This aspect is attained by solitude and practices that transcend conventional structures.

Vāmadeva 
Represents Citta rūpa and Citta rūpiṇi of Śiva. This is Turīya, attained by getting acquainted with primordial energy of the sun. This face of Śiva has special powers to heal both mentally and physically of any creature. Represents Parāliṅga. Two billion mantras are trying to describe this face of Śiva. Blood red in color it represents unmatched force that is capable of transforming all elements of the cosmos. Uplifts the element of Tejasa. Direction is North. Predominates the energy of vital life force. It represents indescribable amount of brightness of light. Only those established in yoga can contain it within their physical forms, otherwise the mortal frame sheds itself immediately resulting in union with Vamadeva. The adepts contain energy of creation of elements within themselves.

Aghora 
Represents Jñāna Śaktī (Infinite Knowledge). It is function of Prakṛti (nature, consort of Shiva) and Parā Śaktī. This face of Śiva is Buddhi rūpa (Intellect). Represents Pūrṇagiri Pīṭha. Banaliṅgam. One billion mantras are trying to describe this face of Śiva. Direction is South. Smoke (Dhumra varṇa) in color. It represents our balanced aspect of Ahaṃkāra Tattva (our ego nature). Mixture of Prāmaṇa and Prameya. It represents the forces of Rudra.

Tatpuruṣa 
Represents Ānānda Śaktī. East direction. Kāmagiri Pīṭham. Manorūpa. It represents structure of soul. The individual merges with infinite. Two billion mantras are trying to describe this face of Śiva. Yellow in color. Svambhuva liṅga. If you have severe difficulty in focusing on any subject, you should meditate this face of Śiva. Śiva in this face meditates to the east.

Īśāna 
Represents the Citta Śaktī of Śiva. Sāmbā Pīṭham. Represents Space. Starts from your Mūlādhāra to Anahata to Ajna to Sahasrara leading to Brahma Randra in your body. One billion mantras are trying to describe this face of Śiva. Ākāśa (Ether) Tattva. The individual is from very less to not at all receptive to social structures. Possesses excellent qualities of controlling mortal and divine beings with ease. The individual has reduced his ego to ashes signifying absolute love for the universe and has been freed from cosmic law. Their direction is upward (also called skyward).

Summary

Meditation 

Depending on your Rāśi, Lagna, Daśā, Antardaśā, Janma Nakṣatra, whichever is strong you should meditate that face of Śiva.

For example, Aghora represents South. If your resultant is south (i.e., rāśi, lagna occupies south direction of Sun in your horoscope), you can mediate Southern face of Śiva i.e., Aghora. Depending on the problematic area of life, Kendra, Koṇa, Duṣṭhāna, Trikoṇa, Āpoklima - you should meditate that face of Śiva to get some relief in that problematic area.

For example, with somebody having Taurus (Vṛṣabha) rāśi as lagna, having Venus is in 11th bhāva i.e., Pisces (Mīna). Running Daśā is Guru Daśā and Antardaśā is Saturn.

Now, let’s say in this example, Venus is strong in Pisces, but he is running Guru Daśā, If Guru is present in Dhanus, then we consider him as weak because he is occupying the 8th House. Since Guru is present in north east corner of the horoscope, he should start with Northern face of Śiva mantra.

See also 
 Pancabrahma Upanishad

References

Bibliography 

 

Forms of Shiva